Irupana is a location in the La Paz Department in Bolivia. It is the seat of the Irupana Municipality, the second municipal section of the Sud Yungas Province.

References 

 Instituto Nacional de Estadistica de Bolivia

Populated places in La Paz Department (Bolivia)